The East Avenue Medical Center (EAMC) is a government-owned tertiary general hospital located in Central, Quezon City, Philippines.

History
The EAMC was established as the GSIS General Hospital under the Government Service Insurance System (GSIS) and was inaugurated by then President Ferdinand Marcos along with Imelda Marcos on October 8, 1969. The company operating the hospital, GSIS Hospital, Inc. was dissolved on June 9, 1978 in pursuant to Presidential Decree No. 1411 issued by President Marcos, and transferred all of the assets of the company to the Ministry of Health (now Department of Health) and the hospital was renamed Ospital ng Bagong Lipunan.

The hospital was renamed again on November 12, 1986, by then Executive Secretary Joker P. Arroyo by authority of then President Corazon Aquino, to its current name through Memorandum Order No. 48. The Republic Act No. 8345 signed on June 4, 1997 increased the authorized bed capacity of the hospital from 350 to 600. The allowed 600 bed capacity was fulfilled on August 17, 2020 when the new 250 bed capacity EAMC building was completed and inaugurated. It was used as a treatment facility during the COVID-19 pandemic. On June 24, 2021, EAMC, by virtue of Republic Act No. 11561, increased the authorized bed capacity from 600 to 1000 beds.

References

Hospitals in Quezon City
Hospitals established in 1969
1969 establishments in the Philippines
Buildings and structures in Quezon City